Jean Rasmussen formerly Jean Kingdon-Ward née Macklin (27 January 1921 – 3 December 2011) was a botanist, botanical collector, explorer and writer who participated in five major expeditions in India and Burma. She collecting numerous scientific specimens of plants, some of which were new to science. The species Lilium mackliniae was named in her honour. Rasmussen wrote about her expedition to the Lohit river valley on the border of Tibet and her experiences with the 1950 Assam–Tibet earthquake during that expedition in her book My Hill So Strong.

References

1921 births
2011 deaths
English botanists
English explorers
Plant collectors
English writers
Women botanists